Phytoecia annulata is a species of beetle in the family Cerambycidae. It was described by Hampe in 1852. It is known from Syria, Iran, and Turkey.

Varietas
 Phytoecia annulata var. wawerkana (Reitter, 1905)
 Phytoecia annulata var. angorensis (Pic, 1952)

References

Phytoecia
Beetles described in 1852